Rear Admiral Sarah Edith Sharkey  is an Australian physician, medical administrator, and a senior officer in the Royal Australian Navy. She has been Commander Joint Health and Surgeon General of the Australian Defence Force since 2 December 2019.

While holding the rank of captain, Sharkey was awarded a Conspicuous Service Cross (CSC) in the 2014 Queen's Birthday Honours for "outstanding achievement as the Director of Clinical Governance and Projects and Australian Defence Force Health Services Project Transition Lead". She was appointed as a Member of the Order of Australia (AM), in the Military Division, in the 2020 Queen's Birthday Honours "for exceptional service to the Australian Defence Force in the management of health care".

Personal life
Sharkey is married to Frank and has four children.

References

Living people
Australian military doctors
University of Queensland alumni
Royal Australian Navy admirals
Women in the Australian military
Year of birth missing (living people)
Recipients of the Conspicuous Service Cross (Australia)
 Members of the Order of Australia